Works by or about James Wood, English critic and writer.

Books

Novels

Non-fiction
 
Bulgarian edition:

Essays, reporting and other contributions
 
 
 
 
 
 
 
  David Gilbert's & Sons.
 
 
 
 
 
 
 
 
 
 
 
 

Introductions, forewords etc.
Selected Stories of D. H. Lawrence (Modern Library, 1999)
Collected Stories of Saul Bellow (Penguin, 2002)
The Golovlyov Family by Mikhail Evgrafovich Saltykov (New York Review Books, 2001)
The Heart of the Matter by Graham Greene (Penguin, 2004)
Tess of the d'Urbervilles by Thomas Hardy (Modern Library, 2001)
The Woodlanders by Thomas Hardy (Modern Library, 2002)
The Myth of Sisyphus by Albert Camus (Penguin Modern Classics, 2000)
La Nausée by Jean-Paul Sartre (Penguin Modern Classics, 2000)
Novels 1944-1953: Dangling Man, The Victim, The Adventures of Augie March by Saul Bellow (Library of America, 2003)
Austerlitz by W.G. Sebald (Penguin, 2011)
The Book of Common Prayer (Penguin, 2012)
Caught by Henry Green (New York Review Books, 2016)
A Difficult Death: The Life and Work of Jens Peter Jacobsen by Morten Høi Jensen (Yale University Press, 2017)

Critical studies and reviews of Wood's work
How fiction works
 Peter Conrad in The Observer
 John Banville in The New York Review of Books

Notes

Bibliographies by writer
Bibliographies of British writers
Bibliographies of English writers